Vatra (English: Fire) is the fifth studio album by the Yugoslav and Bosnian heavy metal band Divlje Jagode. The album was recorded at Studio RTV Sarajevo, Sarajevo, Bosnia and Herzegovina from November to December 1984, and mixed at Music Paark Studio in Bad Homburg vor der Höhe, Germany in February 1985 and was released in April 1985. It was the first time that Alen Islamović made an album just as vocal as he was before and vocalist and bassist also. 
The album contained nine songs with a real glam and hair metal sound, but was also influenced by the sound of Black Sabbath and Saxon, with the occasional Judas Priest riff. Islamovic wrote the lyrics for most songs, and the album had one song in English titled "Touch Me Little Girl", written by their producer Theo Werdin.

Track listing
All music written by Sead Lipovača, except "Touch Me Little Girl" which written by Theo Werdin and M. Zai.

Personnel
Sead Lipovača - lead guitar
Alen Islamović - lead vocals, 
Zlatan Ćehić - bass,
Nasko Budimlić - drums

Production
Theo Werdin - producer
Anun Marković - sound engineer
Mladen Rodić - organizer

References

External links
Vatra at Discogs
Vatra at Encyclopaedia Metallum
Vatra at Divlje Jagode Official Site

1984 albums
Alen Islamović albums
Divlje jagode albums